David William Blight (born 1949) is the Sterling Professor of History, of African American Studies, and of American Studies and Director of the Gilder Lehrman Center for the Study of Slavery, Resistance, and Abolition at Yale University. Previously, Blight was a professor of History at Amherst College, where he taught for 13 years. He has won several awards, including the Bancroft Prize and Frederick Douglass Prize for Race and Reunion: The Civil War in American Memory, and the Pulitzer Prize and Lincoln Prize for Frederick Douglass: Prophet of Freedom. In 2021 he was elected to the American Philosophical Society.

Early life and education
Blight was born on March 21, 1949, in Flint, Michigan, where he grew up in a mobile home park. He attended Flint Central High School, from which he graduated in 1967.

He then attended Michigan State University where he played for the Michigan State Spartans baseball team and graduated in 1971 with a Bachelor of Arts in history. Blight taught at Flint Northern High School for seven years. He received his Master of Arts degree in American history from Michigan State in 1976 and a Doctor of Philosophy degree in the discipline from the University of Wisconsin–Madison in 1985 with a dissertation titled Keeping Faith in Jubilee: Frederick Douglass and the Meaning of the Civil War.

Career
Following stints at North Central College (1982–1987) and Harvard University (1987–1989), Blight taught at Amherst College from 1990 to 2003. In 2001, he published Race and Reunion: The Civil War in American Memory. It "presented a new way of understanding the nation's collective response to the war, arguing that, in the interest of reunification, the country ignored the racist underpinnings of the war, leaving a legacy of racial conflict." The book earned Blight both the Bancroft Prize and Frederick Douglass Prize.

After being hired by Yale in 2003 and teaching as a full professor, in 2006 Blight was selected to direct the Gilder Lehrman Center for the Study of Slavery, Resistance and Abolition. His primary focus is on the American Civil War and how American society grappled with the war in its aftermath. His 2007 book A Slave No More: Two Men Who Escaped to Freedom, Including Their Own Narratives of Emancipation context for newly discovered first-person accounts by two African-American slaves who escaped during the Civil War and emancipated themselves.

He also lectures for One Day University. In Spring 2008, Blight recorded a 27-lecture course, The Civil War and Reconstruction Era, 1845–1877 for Open Yale Courses, which is available online.

Blight wrote Frederick Douglass: Prophet of Freedom, released in 2018, as the first major biography of Douglass in nearly three decades. One reviewer called it "the definitive biography of Frederick Douglass" and another heralded the book as "the new Frederick Douglass standard-bearer for years to come." It earned the 2019 Pulitzer Prize in history and the 2019 Gilder Lehrman Lincoln Prize.

Contributing to the anthology Our American Story (2019), Blight addressed the possibility of a shared American narrative. He cited Frederick Douglass's 1867 speech titled "Composite Nation" calling for a "multi-ethnic, multi-racial 'nation' ... incorporated into this new vision of a 'composite' nationality, separating church and state, giving allegiance to a single new constitution, federalizing the Bill of Rights, and spreading liberty more broadly than any civilization had ever attempted".  Blight concluded that although the search for a new unified American story would be difficult, "we must try".

In July 2020, Blight was one of the 153 signers of the "Harper's Letter," published in Harper's Magazine and titled "A Letter on Justice and Open Debate"), which expressed concern that "The free exchange of information and ideas, the lifeblood of a liberal society, is daily becoming more constricted."

Awards
 2001 Frederick Douglass Prize for Race and Reunion: The Civil War in American Memory.
 2002 Bancroft Prize; co-winner, James A. Rawley Prize from the Organization of American Historians; 2002 Ellis W. Hawley Prize, Organization of American Historians; Merle Curti Award; and Lincoln Prize for Race and Reunion
 2008 Connecticut Book Prize for A Slave No More: Two Men Who Escaped to Freedom, Including Their Own Narratives of Emancipation
 2012 Anisfield-Wolf Prize for American Oracle: The Civil War in the Civil Rights Era
 2018 Vincent J. Dooley Distinguished Teaching Fellow, honor bestowed by the Georgia Historical Society.
 2018 The Lincoln Forum's Richard Nelson Current Award of Achievement
 2019 Gilder Lehrman Lincoln Prize for Frederick Douglass: Prophet of Freedom
 2019 Pulitzer Prize for History for Frederick Douglass: Prophet of Freedom
 2019 PEN Oakland Josephine Miles Literary Award for Frederick Douglass: Prophet of Freedom
 2020 American Academy of Arts and Letters Gold Medal in History
 2022 American Academy of Achievement’s Golden Plate Award

Works

Books as author

Books as contributor
 (Contributor) "The Theft of Lincoln in Scholarship, Politics, and Public Memory," 
 (Contributor and co-editor, with Jim Downs) "Introduction" (co-authored with Gregory P. Downs and Jim Downs), 
 (Contributor) "Composite Nation?",

References

External links

Yale History Faculty: David W. Blight
"Historian David Blight to Direct the Gilder-Lehrman Center at Yale", Yale, 6 April 2009
The Gilder Lehrman Center for the Study of Slavery, Resistance and Abolition, Yale University
Online Videos: David W. Blight, The Civil War and Reconstruction Era, 1845–1877 , Open Yale Courses, 27 lectures, recorded Spring 2008, Yale University. Available free of charge via iTunes U.

1949 births
Living people
21st-century American historians
21st-century American male writers
Writers from Flint, Michigan
University of Wisconsin–Madison alumni
Amherst College faculty
Flint Central High School alumni
Historians of the American Civil War
Lincoln Prize winners
Yale University faculty
Fellows of the American Academy of Arts and Sciences
Historians of slavery
Yale Sterling Professors
Bancroft Prize winners
Members of the American Philosophical Society
Historians from Michigan
American male non-fiction writers